Arthur Loomis Sanborn (November 17, 1850October 18, 1920) was an American lawyer and judge. He was United States district judge for the United States District Court for the Western District of Wisconsin, appointed by President Theodore Roosevelt, he served from 1905 until his death in 1920.

Early life and education

Born in Brasher Falls, New York, Sanborn moved with his parents to Wisconsin in 1857, settling in Lake Geneva. His father died when he was 11 years old, leaving the family in a difficult financial situation. To help the family, he went to work in a wool mill. He was self-educated, and, when the family moved to Elkhorn, the county seat, in 1869, he was able to obtain employment as a clerk in the office of the Register of Deeds. He began to study law and was elected Register of Deeds for Walworth County, serving from 1875 to 1879. In 1879 he entered the University of Wisconsin Law School, where he received his Bachelor of Laws the following year.

Career 
He formed a law partnership with former mayor Silas U. Pinney in Madison, where he would practice law for the next 25 years. Their partnership would endure until Mr. Pinney's election to the Wisconsin Supreme Court in 1891. The firm Pinney & Sanborn was involved in many important railroad cases in the state. During this period, Sanborn was also employed as a professor of law on the faculty of the University of Wisconsin, and served on the state board of bar examiners. Sanborn was the Republican candidate for mayor of Madison in 1890, but was defeated by city attorney Robert McKee Bashford. In 1893, Sanborn formed a new partnership, Spooner, Sanborn & Spooner, with former U.S. Senator John Coit Spooner.

Federal judicial service

On January 6, 1905, Sanborn was nominated by President Theodore Roosevelt to a seat on the United States District Court for the Western District of Wisconsin vacated by Judge Romanzo Bunn. Sanborn was confirmed by the United States Senate on January 9, 1905, and received his commission the same day. Sanborn served in that capacity until his death on October 18, 1920.

Personal life

Arthur Sanborn married Alice E. Golder, of Elkhorn, on October 15, 1874. They had four children together.

Sanborn is descended from Lieutenant John Sanborn, an early settler at the Province of New Hampshire.

Electoral history

Madison Mayor (1890)

| colspan="6" style="text-align:center;background-color: #e9e9e9;"| General Election, April 1, 1890

References

External links
 
 

1850 births
1920 deaths
People from St. Lawrence County, New York
Judges of the United States District Court for the Western District of Wisconsin
United States district court judges appointed by Theodore Roosevelt
20th-century American judges
University of Wisconsin Law School alumni